Terwillegar Drive is a developing freeway in south-west Edmonton, Alberta. It is under construction, with the majority of its intersection at-grade, it retains its arterial road status. Once completed, it will be the third freeway in Edmonton not to have a highway designation after Groat Road and Wayne Gretzky Drive. South of Windermere Boulevard the roadway goes by 170 Street SW.

Route description
Terwillegar Drive begins at Whitemud Drive where Whitemud Drive turns from an east-west to north-south orientation as it approaches the North Saskatchewan River, and is accessible via a modified trumpet interchange with left exit ramps. It travels in a southwest direction through the Riverbend and Terwillegar Heights areas, passing through three split intersections that are staged for future diamond interchanges. Terwillegar Drive crosses Anthony Henday Drive and enters the Windermere area. At Windermere Boulevard, another split intersection, Terwillegar Drive enters the southwest (SW) quadrant and becomes 170 Street SW, turning south. 170 Street SW continues south to Ellerslie Road / Hiller Road (Ellerslie Road was realigned from the 9 Avenue SW alignment, the original alignment is slated to be removed) where 170 Street is misaligned (aligned to the southbound and northbound off-ramps of a future diamond interchange) and continues south as a rural road. At 41 Avenue SW, the roadway enters Leduc County and continues south as Range Road 253.

Future
The City of Edmonton is presently engaged in two planning studies to upgrade Terwillegar Drive and 170 Street SW to a freeway, which was originally envisioned in the 1980s. While the right-of-way is protected, the interchange plans are still in the design stage and there is no timeline set for construction. It remains to be seen if the 170 Street SW section will be renamed Terwillegar Drive, current planning documents refer to both names.

Additionally, there are plans to extend the freeway into Leduc County, passing west of the Edmonton International Airport, and then swing east across Highway 2 and join Highway 2A south of Leduc.

Neighbourhoods
Terwillegar Drive is the main spine and highway that travels through the Riverbend/Terwillegar/Windermere area of Southwest Edmonton. The list of specific neighbourhoods that Terwillegar Drive runs through, in order from south to north are:
Ramsay Heights
Bulyea Heights
Rhatigan Ridge
Carter Crest
Falconer Heights
Leger
Haddow
Terwillegar Towne
Windermere Estates
Ambleside
Windermere
Keswick
Glenridding Heights
Glenridding Ravine

Major intersections
This is a list of major intersections, starting at the north end of Terwillegar Drive.

See also 

 Transportation in Edmonton

References

External links
 Terwillegar Drive Concept Planning Study
 170 Street South Planning Study - Anthony Henday Drive interchange to 41 Avenue SW

Proposed roads in Canada
Roads in Edmonton